Miha Zajc (born 1 July 1994) is a Slovenian footballer who plays as a midfielder for Fenerbahçe and the Slovenia national team.

Club career

Interblock
Zajc was born in Šempeter pri Gorici. As a youth, he played in the youth selections of Interblock from the capital of Ljubljana. He made his senior debut on 3 March 2012 against Dravinja and made a total of five league appearances in his first and last year at Interblock.

Loan to Olimpija and Celje
In summer 2012 Zajc moved to Olimpija Ljubljana. He played only one game with the club, against Mura 05 in the Slovenian PrvaLiga, where he scored two goals in an eventual 3–1 victory. Zajc moved on loan to Celje in January 2013. He made his league debut with Celje on 2 March 2013, starting the match in a 0–0 draw against Gorica. The loan was also confirmed for the following season and on 30 October 2013 he scored his first goal, in a 3–1 home defeat against Rudar Velenje in the second leg of the quarter-finals of the Slovenian Cup. On 12 April 2014 he scored his first goal in the Slovenian PrvaLiga with Celje, scoring the team's second goal in a 2–0 home win over Triglav Kranj.

Olimpija Ljubljana
Zajc returned to Olimpija for the 2014–15 season. He made his second debut for Olimpija on 16 August 2014 in a 2–0 league win against Rudar Velenje. With Olimpija, he won the 2015–16 PrvaLiga title. His last season with the club was the 2016–17 season, in which he scored 7 goals before leaving the club in the winter transfer window. In his three seasons with Olimpija, he made 70 appearances and collected 16 goals in the Slovenian PrvaLiga.

Empoli
Zajc moved to Empoli on 25 January 2017, and signed a four-year contract. He debuted in Serie A on 29 January in a 4–1 defeat against Crotone. In his first season, he made five appearances and scored one goal in Serie A. However, Empoli was relegated to Serie B at the end of the season. Zajc made 41 appearances in the 2017–18 Serie B season, scoring 8 goals and as many as 14 assists, making a fundamental contribution to Empoli's return to Serie A. In the following season, Zajc played 20 games in the 2018–19 Serie A with the Tuscan club, scoring 3 goals and providing 2 assists. He however did not finish the season at Empoli as he changed the club in the winter transfer window.

Fenerbahçe
Zajc moved to Fenerbahçe in the midst of the 2018–19 season, making 10 appearances in the 2018–19 Süper Lig. That year Fenerbahçe reached the round of 32 in the UEFA Europa League, and finished sixth in the national championship. In the next season, in which he suffered an ankle ligaments injury, Zajc played only 17 games with Fenerbahçe, scoring two goals.

Loan to Genoa
Zajc moved to Italian side Genoa in September 2020. With Genoa he reached the round of 16 in the 2020–21 Coppa Italia, and placed eleventh in the 2020–21 Serie A. Zajc made 31 league appearances during the season, provided 3 assists and also scored one goal, against Bologna on 9 January 2021. During his time at Genoa he contributed to the club's positive performances in Serie A, especially with his assists.

International career
Between 2009 and 2016, Zajc played for Slovenia at all youth international levels from under-16 to under-21. He debuted for the senior team in March 2016 in a friendly match against Macedonia.

Player profile

Style of play
Zajc is a trequartista who can be employed behind one or two strikers, and can also play as a central midfielder. When needed he has also played as a deep-lying playmaker and left midfielder. He is considered a very technical player, and among his qualities are his set pieces ability and ability to defend the ball. Zajc is endowed with tactical vision and strategic planning. He is a right footed, and also has good dribbling skills and a good long-range shot.

Zajc has stated that he is inspired by Luka Modrić.

Reception
After moving to Empoli, Zajc impressed with his performances in Italy, leading Empoli to its promotion to Serie A. A talented player, his continuity has sometimes been criticized.

Career statistics

Club

International

Scores and results list Slovenia's goal tally first, score column indicates score after each Zajc goal.

Honours
Olimpija Ljubljana
Slovenian PrvaLiga: 2015–16

Empoli
Serie B: 2017–18

References

External links
NZS profile 

1994 births
Living people
People from Šempeter pri Gorici
Slovenian footballers
Slovenia youth international footballers
Slovenia under-21 international footballers
Slovenia international footballers
Association football midfielders
NK IB 1975 Ljubljana players
NK Olimpija Ljubljana (2005) players
NK Celje players
Empoli F.C. players
Fenerbahçe S.K. footballers
Genoa C.F.C. players
Slovenian Second League players
Slovenian PrvaLiga players
Serie A players
Serie B players
Süper Lig players
Slovenian expatriate footballers
Slovenian expatriate sportspeople in Italy
Expatriate footballers in Italy
Slovenian expatriate sportspeople in Turkey
Expatriate footballers in Turkey